Tomi Milardovic (born 6 August 1982 in Melbourne, Victoria) is an Australian footballer who plays for Pascoe Vale. He was signed by Adelaide United in 2007 on a short-term contract as injury cover for Angelo Costanzo.

Honours 
NPL Victoria Team of The Week Round 2 2017

References

1982 births
Living people
Soccer players from Melbourne
Melbourne Knights FC players
Adelaide United FC players
A-League Men players
Association football central defenders
Australian soccer players
Australian people of Croatian descent